Bob Hewitt and Fred Stolle were the defending champions, but decided not to play together. Stolle partnered with Roy Emerson but lost in the third round to Rafael Osuna and Antonio Palafox.

John Newcombe and Tony Roche defeated Hewitt and his partner Ken Fletcher in the final, 7–5, 6–3, 6–4 to win the gentlemen's doubles tennis title at the 1964 Wimbledon Championship.

Seeds

  Roy Emerson /  Fred Stolle (third round)
  John Newcombe /  Tony Roche (champions)
  Dennis Ralston /  Ham Richardson (semifinals)
  Ken Fletcher /  Bob Hewitt (final)

Draw

Finals

Top half

Section 1

Section 2

Bottom half

Section 3

Section 4

References

External links

Men's Doubles
Wimbledon Championship by year – Men's doubles